The Christian Democratic Union (KDS) is a minor Christian-democratic political party in Latvia. It is a member of the Awakening alliance and is currently led by Māra Viktorija Zilgalve and Secretary General Armands Agrums.

History 
The KDS was founded in 1991. The party participated in the 1993 Saeima election and obtained 5.0% of the vote and six seats. In the next parliamentary election in 1995 the party contested in alliance with the Latvian Farmers' Union and won 6.3% of the vote and eight seats. In 1998 it joined forces with the Workers' Party and the Latvian Green Party, in 2002 with Latvia's First Party and in 2006 with the Latvian Social Democratic Workers' Party.

In the 2010 legislative election it got just 0.36% of the votes and thus failed to overcome the 5% threshold.

The two European elections in 2004 and 2009 were unsuccessful (0.4% and 0.3% of the vote respectively).

The party formed the SKG Alliance with two other parties, the Latvian Social Democratic Workers' Party and Honor to Serve Our Latvia, to run together in the 2018 Saeima election. After the Social Democrats later left, the alliance was renamed to Awakening.

Since 2019, the Awakening alliance has not participated in any elections.

Program 
The party's platform is based on Christian values. Economically the Christian Democratic Union advocates the elimination of corruption, lower taxes, free enterprise, the strengthening of agriculture and the improvement of infrastructure. The party favours the model of a social market economy in the tradition of Ludwig Erhard.

References

External links
Official website

Political parties in Latvia
1991 establishments in Latvia
1991 establishments in the Soviet Union
Conservative parties in Latvia
Political parties established in 1991
Pro-independence parties in the Soviet Union
European Christian Political Movement